Vienna Convention can mean any of a number of treaties signed in Vienna. Most are related to the harmonization or formalization of the procedures of international diplomacy, but some are not.

 several treaties and conventions resulted from the Congress of Vienna (1814–15) which redrew the map of Europe, only partially restoring the pre-Napoleonic situation, and drafted new rules for international relations
 Vienna Convention on Money (1857)
 Vienna Convention on Diplomatic Relations (1961)
 Vienna Convention on Civil Liability for Nuclear Damage (1963)
 Vienna Convention on Consular Relations (1963)
 Vienna Convention on Road Traffic (1968)
 Vienna Convention on Road Signs and Signals (1968)
 Vienna Convention on the Law of Treaties (1969)
 Convention on the Issue of Multilingual Extracts from Civil Status Records (1976)
 Vienna Convention on Succession of States in respect of Treaties (1978)
 United Nations Convention on Contracts for the International Sale of Goods (1980), a uniform international sales law
 Vienna Convention for the Protection of the Ozone Layer (1985)
 Vienna Convention on the Law of Treaties between States and International Organizations or between International Organizations (1986)
 United Nations Convention Against Illicit Traffic in Narcotic Drugs and Psychotropic Substances (1988)
 Joint Comprehensive Plan of Action, on the Nuclear Program of Iran (2015)
 Vienna Agreement Establishing an International Classification of the Figurative Elements of Marks, on intellectual property law (1972)

See also
 Congress of Vienna (disambiguation)
 Treaty of Vienna (disambiguation)
 Vienna Conference (disambiguation)
 Vienna Declaration and Programme of Action, a 1993 United Nations human rights declaration
 Vienna System, a highly-conventional bidding system in the game of contract bridge